Zombie Apocalypse is an American crossover thrash/metalcore band, formed by current members of Shai Hulud, Shallow Water Grave, and The Risk Taken, as well as former members of the 1990s New Jersey band Try.Fail.Try. In 1998, Shai Hulud members Matt Fox and Chad Gilbert created a zombie-themed band project, called Boddicker. They recruited ex-Poison the Well guitarist Russel Saunders. Boddicker recorded a two-song demo in 1998 that was never released. Those two songs are now Zombie Apocalypse songs.

Their music is characterized by very short, thrashcore-like, fast songs thematically concerned with zombies and the apocalypse, as the band name would imply. Their lyrics have a political undercurrent that uses horrific imagery as a metaphor to touch on various political, personal, and social issues. They have released two albums: This Is a Spark of Life, on Indecision Records and featuring artwork by Dan Henk, and a split with Leeds, UK-based, and fellow zombie enthusiasts, Send More Paramedics, called Tales Told by Dead Men, released in North America on Hell Bent Records and in Europe on In at the Deep End Records. They also contributed a cover of "Welcome to the Jungle" to a Guns N' Roses tribute album released by Reignition Records.

Although the term "zombiecore" has been used with reference to Zombie Apocalypse, the band itself has never made any claim to any specific genre.

Future
In an interview with Lambgoat  Matt Fox revealed that an  album is planned, and some songs have been written and a title decided. However, due to scheduling conflicts it is uncertain when the record will be completed.

Discography
1998 - Boddicker demo
2003 - This Is a Spark of Life (Indecision Records)
2005 - Tales Told by Dead Men split EP with Send More Paramedics (In at the Deep End Records/Hellbent Records)
2019 - Life Without Pain Is a Fucking Fantasy (Innerstrength Records)

Members
 Matt Fox - guitar (guitar for Shai Hulud)
 Matthew Fletcher - bass (bass for Shai Hulud)
 Ronen Kauffman - vocals (vocals for try.fail.try; vocals for The Hostage)
 Eric Dellon - vocals (vocals for Shai Hulud; drums for Shallow Water Grave)
 Greg Thomas - guitar (guitar for Shai Hulud; vocals for Shallow Water Grave)
Russel Saunders  - guitar (guitarist for Poison the Well)

Related bands
 Shai Hulud
Poison the Well
 Try.Fail.Try
 The Risk Taken
 Shallow Water Grave

References

Metalcore musical groups from Florida